The 1974 Buffalo Bills season was the franchise's 5th season in the National Football League, and the 15th overall. Buffalo made the NFL playoffs for the first time and reached the postseason for the first time in eight seasons. In the playoffs, they lost to the eventual champions, the Pittsburgh Steelers, 32-14 in Pittsburgh. 

This was O. J. Simpson's only playoff game of his career, as the Bills did not have another playoff team with him on the team. Simpson would be traded to the 49ers in 1978, but the 49ers did not make the playoffs that season nor the 1979 season, Simpson's final season in the NFL. In the game, Simpson would only rush for 49 yards on 11 carries and did not score a touchdown. He did, however, catch a touchdown pass from quarterback Joe Ferguson late in the 3rd quarter. 

Buffalo debuted their new uniforms and helmets in 1974, replacing the red "standing buffalo" with the "streaking bison." This updated look was first displayed before a national audience on the first Monday Night Football game of the season, in a dramatic 21–20 victory over Oakland.

Star running back O. J. Simpson, coming off consecutive rushing titles, did not lead the league in 1974, but did cross the 1,000-yard barrier despite a sore knee.

Buffalo's defense was far more stout than it had been in previous years, as it gave up 3,489 yards in 1974, fifth-fewest in the NFL. The Bills' 1,611 passing yards allowed were the third-best in the league.

The 1974 Bills have the odd distinction of being the last team to go a full game without completing a pass, in Week Three of the season against the New York Jets. Despite this, they still managed to defeat the Jets, behind 223 combined Buffalo rushing yards—as well as only 2 completions by Jets quarterback Joe Namath in 18 attempts.

Offseason

NFL draft

Oklahoma State tight end Reuben Gant played his entire seven-year career with the Bills. Quarterback Gary Marangi was the Bills' backup quarterback for three seasons; in 1976, he started the final seven games of the season when starter Joe Ferguson was injured for the season with a back injury.

Personnel

Staff/Coaches

Roster

Regular season

Schedule

Game summaries

Week 1
Buffalo Snaps the Raiders MNF winning streak**

Week 8

Source: Pro-Football-Reference.com

Standings

Playoffs

References

External links
 1974 Buffalo Bills at Pro-Football-Reference.com

Buffalo Bills seasons
Buffalo Bills
Buffalo